Mark Roberts Motion Control designs and manufactures motion control equipment (robotic camera rigs) for both the TV and Film industry. The company, based in Sussex in the UK, received an Academy Award in 1999 for its contribution to the special effects industry in feature films. The company was acquired by Nikon Corporation in September 2017. 

The Bolt High-Speed Cinebot Robot is a 6-axis robotic arm used to capture high-speed camera movements. The rig can be combined with track (3 metres each in length) creating a 7 axis of motion. In January 2018, the company launched "Junior", a more compact and more affordable version of its larger scale Bolt cinebot, which is marketed as "the fastest high-speed camera robot in the world."

The company was established in 1966 when Australian born engineer, inventor and part-time racing driver, Mark Roberts, set up a company to service and upgrade old animation rostrum tables that were used in everything from film titles, cell animation and news clips.

In 2017, Mark Roberts Motion Control was presented with the Queen's Award for Enterprise for International Trade by Prince Richard, Duke of Gloucester.

Recent feature films that used Mark Roberts Motion Control Equipment

 4.3.2.1
 47 Ronin
 A Nightmare on Elm Street
 Aftershock
 Clash of the Titans
 Dredd
 Gulliver's Travels
 Harry Potter and the Deathly Hallows – Part 1
 Harry Potter and the Deathly Hallows – Part 2
 Hugo
 Jack the Giant Killer
 Jackboots on Whitehall
 John Carter of Mars
 Kick Ass
 Life of Pi
 Nanny McPhee and the Big Bang
 Prince of Persia: The Sands of Time

 Prometheus
 Rise of the Planet of the Apes
 Sherlock Holmes: A Game of Shadows
 Snow White and the Huntsman
 Star Wars: The Rise of Skywalker
 Sucker Punch
 The A-Team
 The Chronicles of Narnia: The Voyage of the Dawn Treader
 The Flying Machine
 The Muppets
 The Pirates! In an Adventure with Scientists!
 The Sandman and the Lost Sand of Dreams
 The Wolfman
 This Means War
 Tron: Legacy
 Upside Down
 X-Men: First Class

Past feature films that used Mark Roberts Motion Control Equipment

 1408
 2012
 102 Dalmatians
 99 Francs
 A Knight's Tale
 Across the Universe
 Alexander
 Amazing Grace
 Anaconda
 Angels & Demons
 Asterix & Obelix: Mission Cleopatra
 Avatar
 Babe: Pig in the City
 Batman Begins
 Below
 Black Hawk Down
 Blade
 Blood and Chocolate
 Braveheart
 Bridget Jones: The Edge of Reason
 Brotherhood of the Wolf
 Casino Royale
 Charlie and the Chocolate Factory
 Chicago

 Chicken Run
 Children of Men
 City of Ember
 Dante's Peak
 Dawn of the Dead
 De-Lovely
 Die Another Day
 Dr. Dolittle
 Dr. Dolittle 2
 Dreamcatcher
 Driven
 Ella Enchanted
 Enemy at the Gates
 Enemy of the State
 Entrapment
 Eragon
 EuroTrip
 Existenz
 Extreme Ops
 Face/Off
 Father's Affair
 Fear and Loathing in Las Vegas
 Finding Neverland
 Five Children and It
 Flushed Away

 Fred Claus
 Fur - An Imaginary Portrait of Diane Arbus
 Ghost Ship
 Gladiator
 Hannibal
 Harry Potter and the Chamber of Secrets
 Harry Potter and the Goblet of Fire
 Harry Potter and the Half-Blood Prince
 Harry Potter and the Order of the Phoenix
 Harry Potter and the Philosopher's Stone
 Harry Potter and the Prisoner of Azkaban
 Hellboy II: The Golden Army
 Herbie: Fully Loaded
 I, Robot
 Inspector Gadget
 Jericho Mansions
 Jumper
 K-19: The Widowmaker
 King Arthur

 Lara Croft Tomb Raider: The Cradle of Life
 Lara Croft: Tomb Raider
 Little Buddha
 Little Nicky
 Lost in Space
 Max Payne
 Mimic
 Minority Report
 Mission: Impossible 2
 Mission: Impossible III
 Moon
 Mortal Kombat: Annihilation
 Moulin Rouge!
 My Favorite Martian
 Napoleon
 New York Minute
 Nowhere Boy
 Paycheck
 Penelope
 Peut-être
 Pitch Black
 Planet of the Apes
 Pluto Nash
 Quantum of Solace

 Resident Evil: Extinction
 S.W.A.T.
 S1m0ne
 Sahara
 Saving Private Ryan
 Scooby-Doo
 Secret Window
 Sherlock Holmes
 Six Days Seven Nights
 Sky High
 Sleepy Hollow
 Spider-Man
 Spider-Man 2
 Spider-Man 3
 Star Trek Generations
 Star Trek: Insurrection
 Stardust
 Stuart Little
 Stuart Little 2
 Sunshine
 Superman Returns
 Sweeney Todd: The Demon Barber of Fleet Street
 Terminator 3: Rise of the Machines

 The Alamo
 The Avengers
 The Aviator
 The Big Lebowski
 The Blind Side
 The Bone Collector
 The Borrowers
 The Break-Up
 The Brothers Grimm
 The Bucket List
 The Chronicles of Narnia: Prince Caspian
 The Count of Monte Cristo
 The Da Vinci Code
 The Dark Knight
 The Discovery of Heaven
 The Fountain
 The Golden Compass
 The Haunted Mansion
 The Hitchhiker's Guide to the Galaxy

 The Imaginarium of Doctor Parnassus
 The Importance of Being Earnest
 The Incredible Hulk
 The International
 The Last Shot
 The League of Extraordinary Gentlemen
 The Legend of 1900
 The Life Aquatic with Steve Zissou
 The Matrix Reloaded
 The Matrix Revolutions
 The Mummy
 The Mummy Returns
 The Ninth Gate
 The Others
 The Phantom of the Opera
 The Prince and Me
 The Pursuit of Happyness
 The Visitor

 The World Is Not Enough
 The X-Files
 The Young Victoria
 The Time Traveler's Wife
 Two Brothers
 V for Vendetta
 Vajont - La diga del disonore
 Veronica Guerin
 Wallace & Gromit: The Curse of the Were-Rabbit
 Wimbledon
 You Don't Mess with the Zohan

References

External links
 

Special effects companies
Companies based in Surrey
Recipients of the Scientific and Engineering Academy Award
Nikon